Al-Omari Grand Mosque is a mosque in Beirut Central District, Lebanon.

Overview
The Al-Omari Grand Mosque was originally the Church of Saint John and was built by the crusaders in the 12th century. It was converted into the city's Grand Mosque by the Mamluks in 1291. Damaged during the Lebanese Civil War, the mosque's refurbishment was completed in 2004.

History

One of the most significant religious sites in the city, the Al-Omari Grand Mosque is also one of the most ancient. It was built in 635 ACE during the reign of Islam's second caliph, Umar Bin El Khattab. It was converted into a church during the 12th century; however, the Mamluks restored it into a mosque in the 13th century. Reflecting traces of Byzantine architecture of the former church, the Mamluk style entrance and minarets are very striking. Renovated in 2004, the mosque is a treasure of Beirut. Similar Romanesque churches with triple apses were built in Tyre and Tartus, using recuperated material such as Roman columns and capitals.

In 1291, the Mamluks captured Beirut and converted the church into a mosque. It was renamed Al-Omari Mosque in the name of Caliph Umar Ibn Al-Khattab, it soon became known as "Jami’ Al-Kabir" (the Great Mosque). Its Mamluk-style entrance and minaret were added in 1350. During the French Mandate the façade was redesigned by adding a riwaq, or portico, and integrating the mosque's main entrance into the new colonnade of Maarad Street.

Badly damaged during the Civil War (1975–1990), the mosque's refurbishment was completed in 2004 in a way that reveals the building's origins and history. A second minaret was built on the northwest corner of a new colonnaded courtyard. Beneath it, an ancient cistern with Roman columns and stone vaults has been preserved.

Timeline
1150: The crusaders built the original Church of Saint John.
1291: The Mamluks recaptured Beirut and converted the church into a mosque.
1350: The Mamluk-style entrance and minaret of the mosque were added.
1975–1990: During the Civil War, the mosque was badly damaged .
2004: The mosque's refurbishment was completed in a way that reveals the building's origin and history.

See also
 Romanesque style

References
 Al-Wali, Sheikh Mohammad Taha (1973) Tarikh al-masajid wal jawami’ al-sharifa fi Bayrout, Dar al-Kotob, Beirut.
 Enlart, Camille (1904) "La Cathédrale Saint-Jean de Beyrouth" in: Société Nationale des Antiquaires de France: centenaire 1804-1904, Klincksieck, Paris: 121-133. 
 Information provided by architect Youssef Haidar, Beirut.

Mamluk architecture in Lebanon
Monuments and memorials in Lebanon
Mosques in Beirut
12th-century mosques
Mosques converted from churches